Laila Biali (born 3 October 1980) is a Canadian jazz singer and pianist. She has been nominated for and won a Juno Award and has worked with Chris Botti and Sting.

Career 
Born in Vancouver, Biali began playing piano at a young age. She studied classical piano for many years. At the Royal Conservatory of Music she was attracted to jazz, and when she was nineteen she entered Humber College in Toronto. Four years later she released the album Introducing the Laila Biali Trio.

She moved to New York City and found work as a pianist and vocalist for other musicians. While touring with Paula Cole, she met drummer Ben Wittman, and she and Wittman later married. In 2009 she sang background vocals for Sting's DVD A Winter's Night: Live from Durham Cathedral. She toured with Chris Botti and Suzanne Vega. She has performed at Carnegie Hall in New York City and at Glenn Gould Theatre in Toronto.

Her second album, Tracing Light (2010), received a Juno Award nomination. She recorded House of Many Rooms (2014) with strings and the Toronto Mass Choir. For this album Biali wrote songs and the arrangements. In 2014, she joined the female band Rose & the Nightingale. A few years later she appeared as guest host for Tonic, a jazz program on CBC Radio 2, then became the regular host for Saturday Night Jazz.

Her self-titled 2018 album won the Juno Award for Vocal Jazz Album of the Year.

Awards and honors
 CBC Galaxie Prize, Rising Star Award, National Jazz Awards
 Society of Composers, Authors and Music Publishers of Canada Keyboardist of the Year and Composer of the Year, National Jazz Awards
  2020 SOCAN Special Award. Haygood Hardy Award for excellence in jazz, instrumental or world music

Discography 
 Introducing the Laila Biali Trio (self-released, 2003)
 From Sea to Sky (CBC, 2007)
 Tracing Light (self-released, 2010)
 World Jazz for Haiti (2010)
 Live in Concert (self-released, 2012)
 House of Many Rooms (self-released, 2014)
 Laila Biali (ACT, 2018)
 Out of Dust (2020)

References

External links 
 Official site

1980 births
Living people
Musicians from Vancouver
Canadian women jazz singers
Canadian jazz composers
CBC Radio hosts
Jazz radio presenters
21st-century Canadian women singers
Canadian women radio hosts
Juno Award for Vocal Jazz Album of the Year winners
ACT Music artists
Canadian women composers